SNHS may refer to:
 Science National Honor Society, an American high school honor society

Schools 
 St Ninian's High School (disambiguation)
 Salendine Nook High School, Huddersfield, West Yorkshire, England
 Sarrat National High School, Sarrat, Ilocos Norte, Philippines
 Southern Nash High School, Bailey, North Carolina, United States